Sanhe is a town of Hezheng County in south-central Gansu province, China, located immediately north of the county seat and  southeast of Linxia City. , it has one residential community and seven villages under its administration.

See also
List of township-level divisions of Gansu

References

Township-level divisions of Gansu
Hezheng County